Simon ben Camithus was a 1st-century High Priest of Israel, who was given the office by the Roman procurator Valerius Gratus and held the office from 17AD to 18AD. 
Very little is known of him, however he is briefly mentioned in the Talmud as one of the seven sons of Kimchit to serve as high priest, and according to Josephus was succeeded as High Priest by Joseph Caiaphas.

References

1st-century High Priests of Israel